The 1998 Overseas Final was the seventeenth running of the Overseas Final. The Final was held at the Poole Stadium in Poole, England on 14 June and was open to riders from the American Final and the Australian, British, New Zealand and South African Championships.

1998 Overseas Final
14 June
 Poole, Poole Stadium
Qualification: Top 8 plus 1 reserve to the Intercontinental Final in Vojens, Denmark

References

See also
 Motorcycle Speedway

1998
World Individual